"One Hundred Ways" is a 1981 single released from Quincy Jones's album The Dude on A&M Records. The song features James Ingram on vocals. The song reached number 14 on the U.S. Billboard Hot 100 in 1982.  It was a bigger Adult Contemporary hit, reaching number five in the U.S. and number six in Canada. "One Hundred Ways" received the 1982 Grammy Award for Best R&B Vocal Performance.

Chart performance

Weekly charts

Year-end charts

Samples
The song was sampled in rapper MF DOOM's popular song "Rhymes Like Dimes" (and its instrumental re-release, "Monosodium Glutamate") on 1999's Operation: Doomsday and 2001's Special Herbs, Vol. 1 respectively.

References

External links
  (single edit)
  (LP version)

1981 songs
1981 singles
Quincy Jones songs
James Ingram songs
A&M Records singles
Pop ballads
Rhythm and blues ballads
Songs written by Kathy Wakefield